Albert Joseph Van Camp (September 7, 1903 – February 2, 1981) was a backup first baseman/left fielder in Major League Baseball who played from  through  for the Cleveland Indians (1928) and Boston Red Sox (1931–1932). Listed at 5' 10", 175 lb., Van Camp batted and threw right-handed.

Biography
Van Camp was born in Moline, Illinois. In 1927, Van Camp hit .309 with 11 home runs for the Des Moines Demons of the Western League before entering the majors in 1928 with Cleveland. His most productive season came with the 1931 Red Sox, when he posted career-numbers in games (101), hits (89), runs (34) and RBI (33), while hitting .275, also a career-high.
Before the 1933 season, he was traded by Boston to the Louisville Colonels of the American Association in exchange for catcher Merv Shea.

In a three-season career, Van Camp was a .261 hitter (116-for-444) with 44 runs and 41 RBI in 140 games, including 20 doubles, six triples, four stolen bases, and a .301 on-base percentage without home runs.

Death
Van Camp died at the age of 77 in Davenport, Iowa. He is interred at Mount Calvary Cemetery in Davenport.

References

External links

 Baseball-Reference.Com
 Baseball Almanac

Boston Red Sox players
Cleveland Indians players
Major League Baseball first basemen
Major League Baseball left fielders
Baseball players from Illinois
1903 births
1981 deaths
Nashville Vols players